Albatross is the debut studio album by the American rock band The Classic Crime. released in 2006 on Tooth & Nail Records. To date, it has sold over 40,000 copies, and reached No. 12 on the Top Heatseekers.

Track listing

Personnel 

The Classic Crime
 Matt Macdonald – lead vocals
 Justin DuQue – lead guitar
 Robert Negrin – rhythm guitar
 Alan Clark – bass guitar
 Paul Erickson – Drums

Additional musicians
 Dave Holdredge – Cello

Artwork
Asterik Studio – Art direction and design
Jerad Knudsen – band photography

Management
Jorge Hernandez and Jason Markey – exclusive personal management for Search+Rescue
 Chad Johnson – A&R

Production
 Michael Baskette – producer, mixing
 Dave Holdredge – engineer, mixing
 Tom Lord-Alge – mixing on "The Coldest Heart"
 Jef Moll – Digital editing and programming
 Bernie Grundman – mastering
 Brandon Ebel – executive producer

Charts

References 

2006 debut albums
Tooth & Nail Records albums
The Classic Crime albums
Albums produced by Michael Baskette